is the founder of the Buddhist school Shinnyo-en.

He was born in Yamanashi Prefecture in Japan. After a career as an aeronautic engineer, he dedicated himself to a religious life. He trained at the Daigo-ji monastery and became a Great Master (Great Acharya) of Shingon Buddhism, and founded Shinnyo-en in 1936.

Besides his work as a Great Buddhist Master and teacher, Ito is also known as a talented Buddhist sculptor and photographer. His works were featured in a Centennial Exhibition throughout Japan in 2006 and a major exhibit at the Milk Gallery in New York City in 2008. Other exhibitions include a solo exhibit at the Westwood Art Forum in Westwood, Los Angeles, California from May 8, 2008 – June 29, 2008.

Works
 Ito, Shinjo, Shinjo: Reflections, Somerset Hall Press, 2009.

Further reading

External links

Buddhist Master Shinjo Ito Honored at Milk Gallery, Art Knowledge News
Shinjo Ito Center

Shinnyo-en
1906 births
1989 deaths
Buddhist artists
Japanese Buddhist clergy
Shingon Buddhist monks
20th-century Buddhist monks